Isle of Wight Council is the local authority for the Isle of Wight, a unitary authority and non-metropolitan county in England.

Political control
Since the first election to the council in 1973 following the reforms of the Local Government Act 1972, political control of the council has been held by the following parties:

Non-metropolitan county: Isle of Wight County Council

Unitary authority: Isle of Wight Council

Leadership
The leaders of the council since 2007 have been:

Council elections

Non-metropolitan county elections
1973 Isle of Wight County Council election
1977 Isle of Wight County Council election
1981 Isle of Wight County Council election
1985 Isle of Wight County Council election
1989 Isle of Wight County Council election
1993 Isle of Wight County Council election

Unitary authority elections
1995 Isle of Wight Council election
1998 Isle of Wight Council election
2001 Isle of Wight Council election
2005 Isle of Wight Council election
2009 Isle of Wight Council election
2013 Isle of Wight Council election
2017 Isle of Wight Council election
2021 Isle of Wight Council election

County result maps

By-election results

References

External links

 
Politics of the Isle of Wight
Council elections in the Isle of Wight
Unitary authority elections in England